The year 1696 in science and technology involved some significant events.

History of science
 Daniel Le Clerc publishes Histoire de la médecine in Geneva, the first comprehensive work on the subject.

Mathematics
 Guillaume de l'Hôpital publishes Analyse des Infiniment Petits pour l'Intelligence des Lignes Courbes, the first textbook on differential calculus, including a statement of his rule for the computation of certain limits.
 Jakob Bernoulli and Johann Bernoulli solve the brachistochrone curve problem, the first result in the calculus of variations.

Births
 unknown date – Christine Kirch, German astronomer (d. 1782)

Deaths
 April 30 – Robert Plot, English naturalist and chemist (born 1640)
 Jean Richer, French astronomer (born 1630)

References

 
17th century in science
1690s in science